{{Speciesbox
| image = Lactuca alpestris kz01.jpg
| status = NT
| status_system = IUCN3.1
| status_ref = 
| genus = Lactuca
| species = alpestris
| authority =  (Gand.) Rech. f.
| synonyms = *'Lactuca viminea subsp. alpestrisLactuca viminea var. decumbensPhaenixopus alpestrisScariola alpestris| synonyms_ref = 
}}Lactuca alpestris'' is a species of plant native to Crete in the Ida mountains and is a relative of lettuce.

It is perennial and has yellow flowers. Its achenes are 7m to 8m long. The species grows on rocky slopes, dwarf shrub communities, calcareous garrigue, scree, and rubble. IUCN Red list states the species is threatened due to climate change and agriculture.

References 

alpestris